A lemniscate, in mathematics, is a curve shaped like a figure-eight. It may also refer to:
Polynomial lemniscate, the set of complex numbers for which a given polynomial has a constant absolute value
The infinity symbol ∞, sometimes called a lemniscate because of its shape
Lemniscate (album), by Vinyl Williams

See also 
 Infinity (disambiguation)